David Rowley may refer to:

 David Rowley (writer), British writer
 David Rowley (footballer) (born 1990), Malaysian footballer